Stephen Auerbach (born August 8) is an American filmmaker, television producer and record producer. He most recently made two documentary films that aired on A+E Networks: The Secret Tapes of the O.J. Case, and O.J. Speaks: The Lost Deposition Tapes.

Biography
Auerbach had an executive producer role on the Universal Music release Glen Campbell: Sings For The King (Elvis Presley). This music project includes 18 never-before-heard recordings of Glen Campbell discovered by Auerbach. The reel to reel tapes were lost for over fifty years and were made as demo recordings for Elvis Presley.

Auerbach's feature documentary, Race Across America produced with Jim Lampley aired on NBC. The film won the Grand Jury Prize at the Boulder International Film Festival.

Other films directed by Auerbach include Bicycle Dreams (2010), The Circus Comes to Town, about traveling circus troupes of the Great Depression era, and The Memory Box, about a group of African social activists.

Auerbach's television work includes How'd They Do That (TLC) with sportscaster Pat O'Brien, World's Most Amazing Videos (FOX-TV) with Stacy Keach, I Dare You: The Ultimate Challenge (UPN) with Evel Knievel, World's Most Heroic Firefighters, (TLC) Totally Outrageous Love (ABC) with David Brenner, Road to Fame (FOX-TV), The Best of California (syndication) Whacked Out Sports (syndication) and In Search Of (FOX-TV) with Mitch Pileggi.

Auerbach is CEO of the publishing catalogue for Elvis Presley songwriter Ben Weisman.

In 2015 Auerbach published his first book Why I Ride: Stories from the Road of Life. This release is a photo book containing writing for cyclists.

Auerbach began his career as a staff writer for comedian Richard Belzer and as a director's assistant to Norman Jewison on the film Moonstruck.

Awards
Best Documentary Grand Rapids Film Festival
Best Director Yosemite Film Festival 
Best Documentary Lake Arrowhead Film Festival 
Best Sports Documentary Tiburon Film Festival
Best Documentary Breckenridge Film Festival

Filmography
Bicycle Dreams 
Race Across America 
The Memory Box 
Cirque Du Soleil Presents "The Circus Comes To Town 
Florida Ghost Bike 
Bicycle Movies: The Short Film Collection 
Cycling Cinema: The Best From Europe Volume 1

Television
The Secret Tapes of the OJ Case  (A&E) 
O.J. Speaks: The Lost Deposition Tapes (A&E) 
Whacked Out Videos (Syndicated) 
In Search Of (Fox)
World's Most Amazing Videos (Fox)
How'd They Do That (TLC)
The Best of California (NBC) 
You Asked For It (NBC)
Outrageous Love (ABC)
Road To Fame (Fox)
Richard Belzer Show (USA)

References

External links
 Stephen Auerbach on AuerFilms.com
 Stephen Auerbach in Billboard Magazine
 Stephen Auerbach in Rolling Stone Magazine
 Stephen Auerbach as CEO of Ben Weisman Music
 Entertainment Weekly article of Auerbach's Simpson documentaries
 ABC News article and report on Stephen Auerbach's film OJ SPEAKS.  
 Feature article on Stephen Auerbach
 Stephen Auerbach interview with Podium Cafe
 Variety article on Auerbach's 2 A+E documentaries.
 Wrap.com article the never before seen footage and audio utilized in Auerbach's A+E documentaries.
 Ghana News article on the global strategy for Auerbach's A+E documentaries

Living people
American film directors
Year of birth missing (living people)
People from Great Neck, New York
American documentary filmmakers